Aathabis is an urban municipality located in Dailekh District of Karnali Province of Nepal.

The municipality is divided into total 9 wards.

The municipality was established on 10 March 2017, when Government of Nepal restricted all old administrative structure and announced 744 local level units as per the new constitution of Nepal 2015.

Sattalla, Sigaudi, Rakam Karnali, Pipalkot, Singasain and Tilepata Village development committees were Incorporated to form this new municipality. The headquarters of the municipality is situated at Rakam Karnali

Demographics
At the time of the 2011 Nepal census, 97.8% of the population in Aathabis Municipality spoke Nepali, 1.3% Magar, 0.6% Kham, 0.1% Maithili and 0.1% Urdu as their first language; 0.1% spoke other languages.

In terms of ethnicity/caste, 32.8% were Chhetri, 24.8% Kami, 14.7% Hill Brahmin, 13.7% Thakuri, 7.1% Damai/Dholi, 4.3% Magar, 1.4% Sanyasi/Dasnami, 0.4% Sarki, 0.3% other Dalit and 0.6% others.

In terms of religion, 99.5% were Hindu, 0.2% Buddhist and 0.2% Muslim.

References

External links
www.aathabismun.gov.np/

Populated places in Dailekh District
Municipalities in Karnali Province
Nepal municipalities established in 2017